Endoclita buettneria is a species of moth of the family Hepialidae. It is known from Myanmar. The food plant for this species is Byttneria.

References

External links
Hepialidae genera

Moths described in 1941
Hepialidae